A gun is an administrative unit in both North Korea and South Korea similar to the unit of county. 

In South Korea, a gun has a population of less than 150,000 (more than that would make it a city or si), is less densely populated than a gu, and is more rural in character than either of the other 2 divisions. Gun are comparable to British non-metropolitan districts. Counties are divided into towns (eup) and districts (myeon).

See also
Administrative divisions of South Korea
List of counties in South Korea
History of Korea
Provinces of Korea
Commandery (China)

References 

 
 
 
 
Subdivisions of Korea